Vladan Binić (born 25 January 1987) is a Czech-Serbian former professional footballer who played as a winger. He is the son of former Yugoslavia international Dragiša Binić.

Club career
Born in Niš, to a Serbian father, Dragiša, and a Czech mother, Martina, Binić spent the majority of his childhood in Prague. He joined Sparta Prague as a trainee and passed through the club's youth system. In the summer of 2005, Binić went on trial with Red Star Belgrade, but the deal was never finalized. He subsequently played for Sparta's reserve team in the third national tier, making 14 appearances and scoring three goals in the 2006–07 season.

In the 2008 winter transfer window, Binić returned to his homeland and joined Napredak Kruševac. He spent the next two-and-a-half years at the club, scoring six goals in the top flight of Serbian football. In June 2010, Binić was transferred to Red Star Belgrade. He eventually failed to make any league appearance in the 2010–11 season. Afterwards, Binić was loaned to Radnički Kragujevac (fall 2011) and Spartak Subotica (spring 2012).

In the summer of 2012, Binić signed with SuperLiga newcomers Radnički Niš. He also played for Leotar (spring 2014) and Radnik Surdulica (spring 2015), before retiring from the game.

International career
At international level, Binić was capped for the Czech Republic U17s, making one appearance in 2004.

Honours
Radnik Surdulica
 Serbian First League: 2014–15

References

External links
 
 
 

Association football midfielders
Czech footballers
Czech people of Serbian descent
Czech Republic youth international footballers
Expatriate footballers in Bosnia and Herzegovina
FK Leotar players
FK Napredak Kruševac players
FK Radnički 1923 players
FK Radnički Niš players
FK Radnik Surdulica players
FK Spartak Subotica players
Premier League of Bosnia and Herzegovina players
Red Star Belgrade footballers
Serbian expatriate footballers
Serbian expatriate sportspeople in Bosnia and Herzegovina
Serbian First League players
Serbian footballers
Serbian people of Czech descent
Serbian SuperLiga players
Sportspeople from Niš
1987 births
Living people